The men's discus throw event at the 1978 Commonwealth Games was held on 11 August at the Commonwealth Stadium in Edmonton, Alberta, Canada.

Results

References

Final results (The Canberra Times)

Athletics at the 1978 Commonwealth Games
1978